Hallock is a city in and the county seat of Kittson County, Minnesota, United States. The population was 906 at the 2020 census.

History
Hallock was platted in 1879. The city was named for Charles Hallock, an American writer. Hallock was incorporated as a city in 1887. A post office has been in operation at Hallock since 1879.

Geography

U.S. Highway 75 and Minnesota State Highway 175 are two of the main routes in the city.

Climate

Demographics

2010 census
As of the census of 2010, there were 981 people, 449 households and 256 families living in the city. The racial makeup of the city was 98.7% White, 0.1% African American, 0.6% Asian, 0.1% from other races, and 0.5% from two or more races. Hispanic or Latino of any race were 2.8% of the population.

There were 449 households, of which 19.2% had children under the age of 18 living with them, 49.9% were married couples living together, 4.9% had a female householder with no husband present, 2.2% had a male householder with no wife present, and 43.0% were non-families. 40.5% of all households were made up of individuals, and 23.4% had someone living alone who was 65 years of age or older. The average household size was 2.04 and the average family size was 2.77.

The median age in the city was 51.9 years. 17.7% of residents were under the age of 18; 4.1% were between the ages of 18 and 24; 17% were from 25 to 44; 31.5% were from 45 to 64; and 29.8% were 65 years of age or older. The gender makeup of the city was 47.2% male and 52.8% female.

2000 census
As of the census of 2000, there were 1,196 people, 485 households and 305 families living in the city. The racial makeup of the city was 97.91% White, 0.08% African American, 0.17% Native American, 0.17% Asian, 0.59% from other races, and 1.09% from two or more races. Hispanic or Latino of any race were 1.42% of the population.

There were 485 households, of which 30.1% had children under the age of 18 living with them, 54.0% were married couples living together, 6.8% had a female householder with no husband present, and 37.1% were non-families. 35.3% of all households were made up of individuals, and 21.2% had someone living alone who was 65 years of age or older. The average household size was 2.29 and the average family size was 3.00.

24.8% of the population were under the age of 18, 3.8% from 18 to 24, 23.3% from 25 to 44, 21.1% from 45 to 64, and 26.9% who were 65 years of age or older. The median age was 44 years. For every 100 females, there were 81.5 males. For every 100 females age 18 and over, there were 81.3 males.

The median household income was $37,063 and the median family income was $46,042. Males had a median income of $31,848 compared with $21,136 for females. The per capita income for the city was $18,156. About 3.3% of families and 4.8% of the population were below the poverty line, including 4.0% of those under age 18 and 7.8% of those age 65 or over.

Politics

In popular culture
Hallock was a main filming location in the Coen brothers' 1996 film Fargo, substituting as a fictional version of Brainerd, Minnesota due to Hallock having a better snowfall than Brainerd during production.

Notable people
Clifford W. Bouvette, Minnesota legislator
Kristen Dexter, Wisconsin politician
Marv Hanson, Minnesota legislator
Bill Ingebrigtsen, State Senator
Frederick McKinley Jones, inventor
Donald Pederson, educator and inventor

References

External links
City of Hallock

Cities in Minnesota
Cities in Kittson County, Minnesota
County seats in Minnesota